Pleurotomella rossi is a species of sea snail, a marine gastropod mollusk in the family Raphitomidae.

Description
The length of the shell attains 11.9 mm.

Distribution
This species occurs in the Ross Sea, Antarctica and off Visokoi Island, SE of island, South Sandwich Islands, South Atlantic Ocean at a depth between 93 mm and 121 m.

References

 Engl, W. (2012). Shells of Antarctica. Hackenheim: Conchbooks. 402 pp.

External links
 Kantor Y.I., Harasewych M.G. & Puillandre N. (2016). A critical review of Antarctic Conoidea (Neogastropoda). Molluscan Research. 36(3): 153-206
  Griffiths, H.J.; Linse, K.; Crame, J.A. (2003). SOMBASE - Southern Ocean mollusc database: a tool for biogeographic analysis in diversity and evolution. Organisms Diversity and Evolution. 3: 207-213
 Biolib.cz: image
 

rossi
Gastropods described in 1990